This page is a list of the hat-tricks scored for the Spain national football team. Since Spain's first international association football match in 1920, there have been 40 occasions when a Spanish player has scored three or more goals (a hat-trick) in a game. The first hat-trick was scored by José Luis Zabala against Portugal in 1923. The record for the most goals scored in an international by a Spanish player is six, which has been achieved on one occasion: by Chacho against Bulgaria in 1933.

Fernando Torres and David Villa hold the record for the most hat-tricks scored by a Spanish player, with both having three, with the third of both to have been scored in 2013 Confederations Cup and in same game, against Tahiti, that ended up 10-0. Emilio Butragueño and Míchel are the only Spanish players to have scored a hat-trick at the world cup finals, with Butragueño scoring 4 goals (a poker). David Villa is the only Spanish player to have scored a hat-trick at the European championship finals, against Russia. Fernando Torres is the only Spanish player to have scored two hat-tricks at the confederations cup finals, one in the 2009 edition and the other in the 2013 edition.

Hat-tricks for Spain

Hat-tricks conceded by Spain

See also
 David Villa
 Fernando Torres
 Spain national football team
 List of Portugal national football team hat-tricks

References

Hat-tricks
Spain
Spain